Jordan Jeremiah Brown (born 12 November 1991) is a German footballer who plays as a midfielder for TuS Dassendorf.

Career
Brown trialled with Coventry City in July 2016.

References

External links

1991 births
Living people
German footballers
Footballers from Hamburg
Association football midfielders
Hamburger SV II players
FC Wil players
Grasshopper Club Zürich players
FC Eintracht Norderstedt 03 players
TuS Dassendorf players
German expatriate footballers
German expatriate sportspeople in Switzerland
Expatriate footballers in Switzerland